
 
 

Bordertown South is a locality in the Australian state of South Australia located in the state's south-east within the Limestone Coast region about  east of the state capital of Adelaide  and about  south of the municipal seat of Bordertown.

Boundaries for the locality were created on 16 March 2000 for the “local name.”

Land use within Bordertown South is “primary production”.

The 2016 Australian census which was conducted in August 2016 reports that Bordertown South had 44 people living within its boundaries.

Bordertown South is located within the federal division of Barker, the state electoral district of MacKillop and the local government area of the Tatiara District Council.

References

 

Limestone Coast